Kempin is a surname. Notable people with the name include:

Emilie Kempin-Spyri (1853–1901), Swiss lawyer and women's rights activistin
Hans Kempin (1913–1992), German Waffen-SS combat and training officer 
Joachim Kempin (born 1942), German-born businessman and retired Senior Vice President of Microsoft Corporation
Jon Kempin (born 1993), American soccer player